Dusty may refer to:

Places in the United States
 Dusty, New Mexico, an unincorporated community
 Dusty, Washington, an unincorporated community
 Dusty Glacier, Washington

People
 Dusty (given name)
 Dusty (nickname)
 Slim Dusty, Australian outback singer–songwriter born David Gordon Kirkpatrick (1927–2003)
 Dusty Drake, stage name of American country music singer-songwriter Dean Buffalini (born 1965)
 John 'Dusty' King (1909-1987), American singer and actor born Miller McLeod 
 Dusty Springfield (1939–1999), stage name of English soul and pop singer Mary O'Brien

Arts and entertainment

Fictional characters
 Dusty (G.I. Joe)
 Dusty, the sidekick of Archie comics superhero "The Shield"
 Dusty, a singing cowboy in A Prairie Home Companion (film) (2006), Robert Altman's last film
 Dusty Bin, mascot character from the UK gameshow 3-2-1
 Dusty Chandler, a country music singer in the 1992 American film Pure Country, portrayed by George Strait
 Dusty Crophopper, protagonist in Disney's animated films Planes and Planes: Fire & Rescue
 Dusty Donovan, on the American soap opera As the World Turns
 Dusty Hayes, in the animated television series M.A.S.K.
 Dusty McHugh, on the British soap opera Family Affairs
 Dusty, a fictional sandman by Ronald Sperling in Kidsongs: Good Night, Sleep Tight

Music
 Dusty (Dusty Springfield album), the 1964 US version of the debut album of singer Dusty Springfield
 Dusty – The Original Pop Diva, an Australian musical about Dusty Springfield
 "Dusty", a song on the Soundgarden album Down on the Upside
 Dusty (Fred Eaglesmith album), 2004
 Dusty (Homeboy Sandman album)

Films
 Dusty (film), a 1983 Australian film
Dusty, a 1983 TV film starring Nancy McKeon

See also

 
 Dusti, a town in Tajikistan
 Dusti District, Tajikistan
 Dustie Waring (born 1985), American guitarist
 Dust (disambiguation)